Hancock is a town in Delaware County, New York, United States. The town contains a village, also named Hancock. The town is in the southwest part of the county. The population was 3,224 at the 2010 census. The town is the largest by area in Delaware County. The town borders two other counties, Sullivan County, NY, to the south and Wayne County, PA, to the west. The town is located partially in the Catskill Park.

History
This town was established in 1806 from part of the town of Colchester. It is named for John Hancock, signer of the Declaration of the Independence.

Sports and the Upper Delaware River

The town of Hancock, NY, has a rich history of many things, including sports. The most popular sports perhaps are baseball and fishing. Fly fishing is extremely popular due to the Upper Delaware River (UDR), which flows right through the town. The River is a large economic engine that powers many businesses in Hancock and neighboring areas. The Hancock Golf Course was designed in 1941 by famed golf architect, Robert Trent Jones, Sr.

Baseball has been a part of Hancock for generations. A local Hancock native, Eddie Murphy, was a professional baseball player in the major leagues. "Honest Eddie" Murphy appeared in three World Series during his time in the MLB. Most recently, Hancock Central School joined forces with Deposit Central School for all sports, in 2016. The new sporting programs played under the name of, the D-H Eagles. Prior to that, from 2010 to 2015, the Hancock Wildcats won six section 4 baseball championships in a row. During the 2013 and 2014 season, they fell short of the state championship in the final game. In 2014 they fell to Smithtown Christian 7-4 in the state championship game. After many years of grind and determination, joining forces with Deposit in 2016, and falling in the state semi finals in 2017, the D-H Eagles final broke through and won their first State Championship. D-H defeated Fort Plain 9-3.

Geography
The southwestern town line, delineated by the Delaware River, is the border of Pennsylvania. The East Branch of the Delaware flows from east to west across the town, joining the West Branch at Hancock village to form the Delaware River proper. Upstream from Hancock village, the town line and state line are formed by the West Branch. NY Route 17 passes through the town, with access from Exits 87 through 90.

Demographics

As of the census of 2000, there were 3,449 people, 1,390 households, and 913 families residing in the town.  The population density was 21.6 people per square mile (8.4/km2).  There were 2,512 housing units at an average density of 15.8 per square mile (6.1/km2).  The racial makeup of the town was 96.69% White, 0.70% Black or African American, 0.52% Native American, 0.61% Asian, 0.32% from other races, and 1.16% from two or more races. Hispanic or Latino of any race were 2.38% of the population.

There were 1,390 households, out of which 28.6% had children under the age of 18 living with them, 52.3% were married couples living together, 8.1% had a female householder with no husband present, and 34.3% were non-families. 30.1% of all households were made up of individuals, and 15.5% had someone living alone who was 65 years of age or older.  The average household size was 2.48 and the average family size was 3.01.

In the town, the population was spread out, with 24.1% under the age of 18, 5.9% from 18 to 24, 24.1% from 25 to 44, 27.0% from 45 to 64, and 18.9% who were 65 years of age or older.  The median age was 42 years. For every 100 females, there were 98.4 males.  For every 100 females age 18 and over, there were 94.9 males.

The median income for a household in the town was $30,449, and the median income for a family was $37,125. Males had a median income of $28,259 versus $21,875 for females. The per capita income for the town was $16,057.  About 8.4% of families and 14.3% of the population were below the poverty line, including 19.3% of those under age 18 and 13.4% of those age 65 or over.

Notable people
 Henry Bidleman Bascom (1796-1850), religious circuit rider, Methodist bishop, chaplain to US Congress
 Clark L. Hood (1847-1920), Wisconsin State Assemblyman and lawyer
 "Honest Eddie" Murphy, baseball player, appeared in three World Series
 Harold Searles (1918-2015), psychiatrist

Communities and locations in the Town of Hancock
Cadosia — A hamlet northeast of Hancock village.
Centerville — A location in the northern part of the town on New York State Route 30.
Chiloway — A hamlet southwest of Peakville.
East Branch - The Hotel Delaware was listed on the National Register of Historic Places in 2004.
Fishs Eddy — A hamlet northeast of Hancock village on New York State Route 17.
French Woods — A hamlet near the center of the town on New York State Route 97.
Goulds — A hamlet near the eastern town line. See Gould Cemetery website
Hancock — A village by the western town line. 
Harvard — A location near the northeastern town line on New York State Route 30.
Islamberg - a hamlet west of the village. 
Kelsey — A hamlet at the northwestern town line north of Hancock village and south of Cannonsville Reservoir.
Kerry Siding — A hamlet at the northwestern town line.
Kerryville — A hamlet at the northwestern town line.
Kilgore Spur — A location west of Lordville.
Kingswood Campsite — A Methodist campsite.
Long Flat — A location near the northeastern town line.
Lordville — A hamlet by the Delaware River in the southern part of the town. The Lordville Presbyterian Church and the Ravina historic district are listed on the National Register of Historic Places.
Luzerne — A hamlet southeast of Fishs Eddy on New York State Route 28.
Methol — The Lower Shavertown Covered Bridge was listed on the National Register of Historic Places in 1999.
Peakville — A hamlet west of East Branch (historically called Trout Brook).
Pea Brook — A location in the southern part of the town on New York State Route 97.
Peas Eddy — A hamlet east of Hancock village by the Delaware River.
Point Mountain Mausoleum — an abandoned mausoleum at the top of Point Mountain.
Readburn — A hamlet in the northern part of the town.
Rock Valley — A hamlet by the eastern town line.  The Rock Valley School was listed on the National Register of Historic Places in 2008.
Tylers Switch — A hamlet east of Hancock village near New York State Route 17.

References

External links
  Town of Hancock official website
 Visitor's Guide to the Hancock NY area

Towns in Delaware County, New York
New York (state) populated places on the Delaware River